Melanie Soltysik Skillman (born September 23, 1954 in Reading, Pennsylvania) is an American archer who was a member of the American squad that won the team bronze medals at the 1988 Summer Olympics. She also competed in the individual event, finishing in 10th place.

References
 

1954 births
Living people
American female archers
Archers at the 1988 Summer Olympics
Olympic bronze medalists for the United States in archery
Medalists at the 1988 Summer Olympics